Creativerse is a 2017 sandbox game developed by Playful Corp. for Windows and previously macOS. Inspired by Minecraft, it takes place in a voxel-based world of blocks where players interact with flora and fauna, craft items, and build constructions. It first released in early access in August 2014 before officially releasing in May 2017. The game used the free-to-play business model until becoming pay-to-play in November 2022.

Gameplay 
Creativerse puts players in possession of a futuristic gauntlet that allows the manipulation of matter. After customizing the appearance of their character, players are released into a procedurally generated world. Tooltips provide players with the knowledge of gameplay basics and give direction as they set out to explore the world. Players can create or participate in public worlds, stake claims to protect their creations, and tailor their own world via the use of in-game admin tools.

Progression in Creativerse is achieved through the expanding recipe system. Players collect and refine unique resources from the world's various biomes and layers, and then utilize those resources to craft weapons, tools, items, and building materials. As players progress in crafting, they unlock more advanced recipes which include mining cells, extractors, and stations. Mining cells upgrade the player's gauntlet and enable them to gather materials from the deeper layers of the world. Extractors are used to gather precious resources like iron and coal, and stations break resources down for different uses. Some rare recipes can only be found through combat or exploration, while others only drop during seasonal events. While the game is free, premium costumes, recipe bundles, and a "Creativerse Pro" option are available to players through the in-game store. Creativerse Pro provides players with 20 extra inventory slots, the ability to create as many worlds as they like, and other perks like a flashlight and glider.

Development 
Creativerse started with a pay-to-play business model but moved to free-to-play upon its early access release on August 13, 2014. It returned to pay-to-play in December 2022.

Reception
A writer for Bleeding Cool considered the game to be a Minecraft clone, but pointed out the game's graphics and free-to-play business model as being superior.

References

External links

2017 video games
Early access video games
MacOS games
Minecraft clones
Survival video games
Open-world video games
Video games developed in the United States
Video games using procedural generation
Windows games
Video games with Steam Workshop support